The Women's Ashes is the perpetual trophy in women's international cricket series between England and Australia. The name derives from the historic precedent of the Ashes in male cricket and, until 2013, was similarly decided exclusively on the outcomes of Test matches. Since the Australian tour of England in 2013, the competition is decided on a points system, taking account of One-Day Internationals and Twenty20 International matches as well as Tests. Four (previously six) points are awarded for a Test victory (two points to each side in the event of a draw), and two points for a victory in a limited-overs game.

History
Heralded in 1931, the first women's Test series between England and Australia—the first women's Test series anywhere—was played in 1934–35. At that time, according to the English captain, Betty Archdale, women played only "for love of the game" and did not wish to be associated with the male concepts of Tests and Ashes. The contest was not officially designated "the Women's Ashes" until the 1998 series, when an autographed bat was burned before the first Test at Lord's, some ashes then being placed inside a hollowed-out wooden cricket ball replica to manufacture a trophy. In 2013, a new Women's Ashes trophy was produced.

A total of 22 series have taken place, with 49 Test matches played (and one scheduled Test abandoned). The length of series has varied between one and five Tests. Series have been played biennially since 2001, with only one or two tests played in a series. Since the 2013 series, One Day Internationals and Twenty20 International matches have counted, as well as Tests, toward the trophy result. , a Test victory is worth four points (two to each side for a draw), and two points are awarded for victory in a limited-overs match.

In February 2007, England Women travelled to Australia to defend the Women's Ashes, doing so successfully by winning the one-off Test in Bowral by six wickets. In July 2009, England retained the Women's Ashes after the one-off test at Worcester ended in a draw. In January 2011 Australia was victorious, winning a one-off test in Sydney. England regained the trophy on the new points system in August 2013, and successfully defended it in a series played in Australia in January–February 2014. Australia succeeded in regaining the trophy during the 2015 series played in England.

The last Women's Ashes series was contested in England in July 2019, and was won comprehensively by Australia.

Results summary

Test (until 2010–11)

Multi-format (from 2013)

Series
Series decided on Test results:

Series decided on a points system:

Player statistics

Tests (until 2010–11)

Batting
Most runs

Bowling
Most wickets

Multi-format (from 2013)

Batting (all matches)
Most runs

Updated as per end of the 2019 Women's Ashes.

Bowling (all matches)
Most wickets

Updated as per end of the 2019 Women's Ashes.

References

 
Ashes
Recurring sporting events established in 1934
Cricket awards and rankings
 
 
1934 establishments in Australia
1934 establishments in England